Masillatrogon is an extinct genus of trogon. Its remains were found in the Messel Pit of Germany.

References

Prehistoric birds of Europe
Trogonidae
Eocene birds
Prehistoric bird genera
Fossil taxa described in 2009